Kali Michele Rocha (born December 5, 1971) is an American actress. She is known for portraying Karen Rooney, the mother of four Rooney children and school's vice principal, in the Disney Channel sitcom Liv and Maddie. She has also co-written four episodes of the show.

Early life
Rocha was born in Memphis, Tennessee and grew up in Rhode Island, graduating from Carnegie Mellon School of Drama in 1993.

Career
Rocha's career began on stage in the August 1993 revival of the Jane Bowles play In the Summer House at the Vivian Beaumont Theater. Since then she has been in multiple Broadway and Off-Broadway productions including Noises Off and Nicky Silver's comedy The Altruists where she created the role of Cybil.

Her on-screen debut was in the 1996 cinematic adaptation of Arthur Miller's The Crucible, as Mercy Lewis. She stood out when she played the Atlantic American flight attendant who argued with Ben Stiller's character at the airport in the 2000 comedy Meet the Parents, a role she reprised in the sequel Meet the Fockers. She also had a recurring role on Buffy the Vampire Slayer as Anya's vengeance demon friend, Halfrek, and as William the Bloody's love interest, Cecily. Rocha played Stonewall Jackson's wife, Anna in Ron Maxwell's Gods and Generals, an epic drama about the first two years of the American Civil War. Other films include The Object of My Affection, Autumn in New York, White Oleander, When Billie Beat Bobby, and Ready? OK!.

She has appeared on the Will & Grace episode "Strangers With Candice", as a straight woman who flirts with Will. In spring 2006, Rocha began acting in the short-lived NBC sitcom Teachers. She guest-starred in an episode of Law & Order: Special Victims Unit as Cindy Marino, an aggressive TV reporter. Also, she appeared on an episode of Bones as a victim's mother. Rocha has also played the character of a fourth-year resident surgeon, Dr. Sydney Heron, at Seattle Grace Hospital in the ABC TV series Grey's Anatomy.

In 2009, Rocha appeared with fellow Buffy the Vampire Slayer alum Emma Caulfield in the film TiMER. Rocha starred in the first and only season of Sherri starring Sherri Shepherd from The View which was loosely based on Shepherd's life. She played Summer, Sherri's boss and eventual friend. It aired on the Lifetime Network.

In 2016, Rocha was cast as Marcy Burns, a recurring character on the CBS sitcom Man with a Plan. In 2018, she was upgraded to a series regular for the third season.

Personal life
In January 2008, Rocha announced that she was pregnant. She gave birth to her son Barlow Aix Krikorian on August 4, 2008, and her daughter Savria Dune Krikorian on January 25, 2011.

Filmography

Film

Television

External links

References

 

1971 births
20th-century American actresses
21st-century American actresses
Actresses from Memphis, Tennessee
American film actresses
American stage actresses
American television actresses
Living people